Bayview may refer to:

Places

Australia
 Bayview, New South Wales
 Bayview, Northern Territory

Canada
 Bayview, Calgary, a neighborhood in Alberta
 Bayview, Newfoundland and Labrador
 Bayview Avenue, a road in Toronto, Ontario
 Bayview station (Toronto), a TTC subway station located on the above road
 Bayview station (OC Transpo), a station on Ottawa's O-Train Trillium Line

New Zealand
 Bayview, New Zealand, a suburb of North Shore City in the Auckland Region

United States
 Bayview, Alabama
 Bayview, Humboldt County, California, a census designated place
 Bayview, Contra Costa County, California, a census designated place
 Bayview, Idaho
 Bayview, Baltimore, Maryland
 Bayview, Texas
 Bayview, Washington (disambiguation)
 Bayview, Wisconsin, a town
 Bayview–Hunters Point, San Francisco, a neighborhood in San Francisco, California.

Fictional
 Bayview, a fictional city in the computer and video game Need for Speed: Underground 2

Football stadia
Bayview Park, Methil, Fife, Scotland
Bayview Stadium, Fife, Scotland

See also
 Bay View (disambiguation)
 Bayview Cemetery (disambiguation)
 Bayview Hill (disambiguation)